Vladislav Markovich Illich-Svitych (also transliterated as Illič-Svityč; September 12, 1934 – August 22, 1966) was a Soviet linguist and accentologist. He was a founding father of comparative Nostratic linguistics and the Moscow School of Comparative Linguistics.

Biography
Of Polish-Jewish descent, Illich-Svitych was born in Kiev. In 1941, he moved with his parents to Chkalov (now Orenburg) and later to Moscow. His father, Mark Vladislavovich Illich-Svitych (1886–1963), worked as a bookkeeper. His mother, Klara Moiseevna Desner (1901–1955), was chief director of puppet theater in Orenburg.

He resuscitated the long-forgotten Nostratic hypothesis, originally proposed by Holger Pedersen in 1903. While embarking on a field trip to collect data on the Hungarian dialects of the Carpathians, he died in an automobile accident on August 22, 1966, near Moscow.

His death prevented him from completing the Comparative Dictionary of Nostratic Languages, but the ambitious work was continued by his colleagues, including Sergei Starostin and Vladimir Dybo.

Selected publications 
 Nominal Accentuation in Baltic and Slavic, translated by R. L. Leed and R. F. Feldstein, Cambridge, London 1979: the MIT Press. (originally edited in Russian in 1963)

See also
 Illič-Svityč's law

Notes

References
 Merritt Ruhlen: On the Origin of Languages. Studies in Linguistic Taxonomy. Stanford University Press 1994.
Sydney M. Lamb and E. Douglas Mitchell (Hrsg.): Sprung from Some Common Source. Investigations into the Prehistory of Languages. Stanford University Press, Stanford (Calif.) 1991.
 Vitaly Shevoroshkin: Reconstructing Languages and Cultures. Abstracts and Materials from the First International Interdisciplinary Symposium on Language and Prehistory. Brockmeyer, Bochum 1989.
 Bomhard, Allan R. and John C. Kerns: The Nostratic Macrofamily. A Study in Distant Linguistic Relationship. Mouton De Gruyter. Berlin - New York 1994.
 Dolgopolsky, Aharon: The Nostratic Macrofamily and Linguistic Palaeontology. The McDonald Institute for Archaeological Research, Oxford 1998.
 Holger Pedersen: Türkische Lautgesetze. ZDMG 57, 1903.
 Holger Pedersen: Linguistic Science in the Nineteenth Century: Methods and Results. Harvard University Press, Cambridge (Mass.) 1931.

External links
Example of Illich-Svitych's Nostratic reconstruction

1934 births
1966 deaths
Linguists from Russia
Russian people of Polish-Jewish descent
Linguists from the Soviet Union
20th-century linguists
Paleolinguists
Linguists of Nostratic languages
Road incident deaths in the Soviet Union
Long-range comparative linguists
Moscow School of Comparative Linguistics